8-Anilinonaphthalene-1-sulfonic acid (ANS), also called 1-anilino-8-naphthalenesulfonate, is an organic compound containing both a sulfonic acid and an amine group. This compound is used as a fluorescent molecular probe. For example, ANS can be used to study conformational changes induced by ligand binding in proteins, as ANS's fluorescent properties will change as it binds to hydrophobic regions on the protein surface. Comparison of the fluorescence in the presence and absence of a particular ligand can thus give information about how the binding of the ligand changes the surface of the protein. Its permeability to mitochondrial membranes makes it particularly useful.

References 

Naphthalenesulfonic acids
Fluorescent dyes
Anilines